Reviparin is an antithrombotic and belongs to the group of low molecular weight heparins (LMWH).

Medical uses 
 Prevention of blood clots
 Prophylaxis of perioperative thromboembolism
 Treatment of DVT with or without pulmonary embolism (PE)
 Prophylaxis of acute thrombotic events after percutaneous transluminal coronary angioplasty (PTCA)

Chemistry 
Reviparin is a low molecular weight heparin obtained by nitrous acid depolymerization of heparin extracted from porcine intestinal mucosa. Its structure is characterized, for the most part, by a group of 2-O-sulfo-α-lidopyranosuronic acid. The average molecular weight is about 3900 daltons.

References

External links
 
 

Heparins